ZFK Dynamo Moscow is the women's team of Russian football club FC Dynamo Moscow. The club participates in the Russian Women's Football Championship, the top division of Russian women football.

History
The original Dynamo's women team has been founded on 2 December 2021, by support of VTB as women's department of FC Dynamo, to take part in the Russian championship starting from 2022 season.

League and cup history

See also
Dynamo Moscow
Dynamo Moscow (women's basketball)

References

External links 

 «Динамо» открывает новое направление – женский футбол // Dynamo opens a new direction — women's football – official announcement

 
Women Football
Football clubs in Moscow
Association football clubs established in 2021
2021 establishments in Russia